Elevation is a novella by American author Stephen King, published on October 30, 2018, by Scribner. The book contains chapter-heading illustrations by Mark Edward Geyer, who previously illustrated King's first editions of Rose Madder and The Green Mile.

Background information 
King announced Elevation in an interview with Entertainment Weekly on December 22, 2017. While talking about his recent novella Gwendy's Button Box, King said, "I've written another novella called Elevation, which is also a Castle Rock story and, in some ways, it’s almost like a sequel to Gwendy. Sometimes you seed the ground, and you get a little fertilizer, and things turn out." A small excerpt as well as the cover for the book were both unveiled by Entertainment Weekly on May 29, 2018. Despite King referring to Elevation as a novella, the book is billed on the cover as a novel.

Plot details 
In Castle Rock, Maine, Scott Carey faces a mysterious illness which causes bizarre effects on his body and makes him rapidly lose weight, even if he appears healthy on the outside. While battling this disease with his trusted doctor, he also tries fixing a dire situation involving a lesbian couple trying to open a restaurant surrounded by a disapproving public.

Reception 
Kirkus Reviews called it "A touching fable with a couple of deft political jabs on the way to showing that it might just be possible for us all to get along."

Film adaptation 
In an interview with CinemaBlend, filmmaker Jack Bender said he is writing a film adaptation of Elevation.

References

External links 
 Official page on StephenKing.com

Novellas by Stephen King
2018 American novels
2018 fantasy novels
Novels set in Maine
Charles Scribner's Sons books